KQLL (1280 AM, "Kool 102") is a commercial radio station located in Henderson, Nevada, broadcasting to the Las Vegas metropolitan area on the AM dial with a simulcast on K272EE 102.3 FM. KQLL airs an oldies music format. The station is currently owned by Summit Media.

History
The station went on the air in 1956 as KVOV.  It was assigned the call letters KREL on February 17, 1984. On January 28, 1991, the station changed its call sign to KDOL, and on March 6, 1998 to KDOX.

In June 2010, KDOX purchased the construction permit for K272EE licensed to Moapa, Nevada. with the plan to add an FM signal.  On August 12, 2010, this signal went live.

Prior to adopting an oldies music format, KDOX aired a news/talk format known as "Fox News Radio 1280." In August 2010, KDOX introduced a live, local mid-morning talk radio show hosted by Casey Hendrickson and Heather Kydd (formerly the drive-time hosts on competitor KXNT). On August 12, 2010, KDOX introduced a 99-watt FM translator on 102.3 MHz.  KDOX purchased the construction permit for $100.00 in June 2010.

On December 31, 2010, KDOX changed formats to a 50s-70s oldies format known as "Kool 102". Along with the format change, the calls were changed as well to reflect the format. The station became known as KQLL.

Translator

References

External links
FCC History Cards for KQLL

QLL
Radio stations established in 1956
QLL
1956 establishments in Nevada